Friedrich Wilhelm Ernst Ziesemer (8 August 1897 – 3 October 1972) was an Australian dairy farmer, grazier and wheat farmer. Ziesemer was born in Pittsworth, Queensland and died in Toowoomba, Queensland.

See also

References

Australian farmers
Australian Anglicans
Australian people of German descent
1897 births
1972 deaths